Kenta Bell (born March 16, 1977, in Kilgore, Texas) is an American track and field athlete who competes mainly in the triple jump. He won this event at the 2001 Universiade and the 2003 national championship. Bell has also finished third in two IAAF World Athletics Finals.

He has also competed at the larger competitions such as the 2003 World Championships, the 2004 Summer Olympics and the 2005 World Championships where he finished 6th, 9th and 7th respectively.

He received a three-month doping ban after a positive test for methylprednisolone at the 2007 USA Outdoor Track and Field Championships.

He is a 2001 graduate of Northwestern State University in Natchitoches, Louisiana.

Bell placed second in the Olympic trials and competed in the 2008 Olympic Games, where he finished 25th in the qualifying stage.

Bell received a lifetime ban for engaging in and orchestrating prohibited doping conduct from USADA on November 7, 2017.

Personal bests
Long jump - 8.07 m (2000)
Triple jump - 17.73 m (2002)

Achievements

See also
List of doping cases in athletics

References

External links 
 
 Kenta Bell's U.S. Olympic Team bio
 USA Track & Field Bio

1977 births
Living people
People from Kilgore, Texas
American male triple jumpers
Athletes (track and field) at the 2004 Summer Olympics
Athletes (track and field) at the 2008 Summer Olympics
Olympic track and field athletes of the United States
Northwestern State Demons and Lady Demons athletes
African-American male track and field athletes
Universiade medalists in athletics (track and field)
Universiade gold medalists for the United States
USA Outdoor Track and Field Championships winners
Medalists at the 2001 Summer Universiade
Sportspeople banned for life
21st-century African-American sportspeople
20th-century African-American sportspeople
College men's track and field athletes in the United States